Alina Stoica (born January 18, 1979, Baia Mare) is a Romanian rhythmic gymnast.

Stoica competed for Romania in the rhythmic gymnastics individual all-around competition at the 1996 Summer Olympics in Atlanta. There she tied for 11th place in the qualification and advanced to the semifinal. In the semifinal she was 15th and didn't advance to the final of 10 competitors.

References

External links 
 
 

1979 births
Living people
Romanian rhythmic gymnasts
Gymnasts at the 1996 Summer Olympics
Olympic gymnasts of Romania
Sportspeople from Baia Mare